The radio frequency 2182 kHz is one of the international calling and distress frequencies for maritime radiocommunication in a frequency band allocated to the mobile service on first priority ("primary") basis, exclusively for distress and calling operations.

Transmission modes
Transmissions on 2182 kHz commonly use single-sideband modulation (SSB) (upper sideband only). However, amplitude modulation (AM) and some variants such as vestigial sideband are still in use, mainly by vessels with older equipment and by some coastal stations in an attempt to ensure compatibility with older and less sophisticated receivers.

{| class=wikitable
|+ Frequency allocation 2173.5–2190.5 kHz
|-
! align="center" colspan="3" style="background-color:#CCCCCC"| Allocation to services
|-
| align="center" | ITU Region 1
| align="center" | ITU Region 2
| align="center" | ITU Region 3
|-
|colspan="3" align="center" | 2173.5–2190.5 kHz
Mobile service (distress and calling)
|-
|}

Range

The reception range of even a well-equipped station can be severely limited in summer because of static caused by lightning.

Silence period
Historically, all stations using 2182 kHz were required to maintain a strictly enforced three-minute silence and listening period twice each hour, starting at h+00ᵐ, h+30ᵐ. This allowed any station with distress, urgent or safety traffic the best chance of being heard at that time, even if they were at some distance from other stations, operating on reduced battery power or perhaps reduced antenna efficiency, as for example from a demasted vessel.

As a visual aide-memoire, a typical clock in a ship's radio room would have these silence periods marked by shading the sectors from h+00ᵐ to h+03ᵐ, and from h+30ᵐ to h+33ᵐ in green. Similar sectors were marked in red for what used to be the corresponding silence and listening period on 500 kHz from h+15ᵐ to h+18ᵐ, and from h+45ᵐ to h+48ᵐ. Since the introduction of GMDSS, these silence periods are no longer required.

Licensing

In order to operate a marine radio transmitter on 2182 kHz, the operator must hold a GMDSS General Operating Certificate for mandatory installations, a Long Range Certificate for voluntary ones, or other equivalent and recognised radio operator's qualifications. Both these certificates have a wider syllabus than those of the GMDSS Restricted Operators Course or the RYA Short Range Certificate that is necessary for marine VHF use. In practice, an unqualified operator would not be prosecuted for the use of either type of transmitter in a situation that turned out to be a genuine emergency.

Related distress frequencies
2182 kHz forms an essential part of the Global Maritime Distress Safety System (GMDSS). It has an associated DSC frequency at 2187.5 kHz. Other international distress frequencies, in use as of 2008, include:

 121.5 MHz and 243.0 MHz – civil aircraft emergency frequency

 243 MHz – military aircraft emergency frequency

 156.8 MHz – Marine VHF radio channel 16, short range maritime use

 406 MHz / 406.1 MHz – Cospas-Sarsat international satellite-based search and rescue (SAR) distress alert detection and information distribution system

Discontinued frequencies
 500 kHz, now obsolete Morse code maritime distress frequency.

 121.5 MHz and 243 MHz, for which locator beacons are no longer automatically monitored by satellite, though the frequencies are still used for aircraft communication and short-range direction finding signals.

 Effective 1 August 2013, the U.S. Coast Guard terminated its radio watch on the international voice distress, safety, and calling frequency 2182 kHz and the international digital selective calling (DSC) distress and safety frequency 2187.5 kHz. Marine information and weather broadcasts that had been transmitted on 2670 kHz ended at the same time. The U.S. Coast Guard does still monitor HF (4–22 MHz) marine distress / safety / calling voice and DSC frequencies.

See also
 Distress signal
 Marine VHF radio
 Mayday (distress signal)
 Pan-pan
 Sécurité
 Global Maritime Distress Safety System
 500 kHz

References

External links
 
 
 

Distress signals
Emergency communication
International telecommunications
Maritime communication
Rescue